Fylde could refer to

The Fylde, a coastal plain in Lancashire, England, or, within it:
Borough of Fylde, a local government district
Fylde (UK Parliament constituency)
FY postcode area covering the western side of the Fylde
AFC Fylde, an association football club
Fylde Ladies F.C., an association football club
Fylde Rugby Club, a rugby club in Lytham St Annes
 Fylde Air Base, Zimbabwe
Fylde College, Lancaster University – named after the Lancashire coastal plain
Fylde Guitars